In probability theory, the zero-truncated Poisson (ZTP) distribution is a certain discrete probability distribution whose support is the set of positive integers.  This distribution is also known as the conditional Poisson distribution or the positive Poisson distribution. It is the conditional probability distribution of a Poisson-distributed random variable, given that the value of the random variable is not zero. Thus it is impossible for a ZTP random variable to be zero. Consider for example the random variable of the number of items in a shopper's basket at a supermarket checkout line.  Presumably a shopper does not stand in line with nothing to buy (i.e., the minimum purchase is 1 item), so this phenomenon may follow a ZTP distribution.

 

The mean is

 

and the variance is

Parameter estimation 
The method of moments estimator  for the parameter  is obtained by solving

 

where  is the sample mean.

This equation does not have a closed-form solution. In practice, a solution may be found using numerical methods.

Generating zero-truncated Poisson-distributed random variables 

Random variables sampled from the Zero-truncated Poisson distribution may be achieved using algorithms derived from Poisson distributing sampling algorithms.

     init:
          Let k ← 1, t ← e−λ / (1 - e−λ) * λ, s ← t.
          Generate uniform random number u in [0,1].
     while s < u do:
          k ← k + 1.
          t ← t * λ / k.
          s ← s + t.
     return k.

Given access to an efficient sampler for non-truncated Poisson random variates, a non-iterative approach involves sampling from a truncated exponential distribution representing the time of the first event in a Poisson point process, conditional on such an event existing. A simple NumPy implementation is:

     def sample_zero_truncated_poisson(rate):
         u = np.random.uniform(np.exp(-rate), 1)
         t = -np.log(u)
         return 1 + np.random.poisson(rate - t)

References

Discrete distributions
Poisson distribution